Christopher Razis (alternate spelling: Christophoros) (born 7 July 1989) is a Cypriot/Greek professional basketball player for Keravnos of the Cypriot League. He is a 1.94 m (6 ft 4.25 in) tall combo guard.

Professional career
Razis played youth basketball with Keravnos at Cyprus where he started his pro career in 2005. he stayed at the club until 2010, when he was awarded the Rookie of the Year in the Cypriot League. The following year, Razis joined ENAD.

After his very good appearances with ENAD, Razis joined EWE Baskets Oldenburg of the Basketball Bundesliga, being the first ever Cypriot basketball player to play professionally in another country other than Greece.

In 2012, he returned to ENAD and one year later, he joined OFI Crete of the Greek A2 Basketball League. After 1,5 years with the team, he decided to leave the team in December 2014, to join Oettinger Rockets Gotha of the Pro A League.

In July 2016, Razis joined Rethymno Cretan Kings of the Greek League.

On June 14, 2017, he joined SC Rasta Vechta of the ProA.

On  June 18, 2018, he re-joined Rethymno Cretan Kings B.C. of the Greek Basket League

Cyprus national team
Razis has been a member of the junior national teams of Cyprus for some years. Razis played for U16 National Team back in 2005. Now, he is one of the leaders of the Cyprus national team where he plays since 2008.

References

External links
 Christopher Razis at fiba.com
 Christopher Razis at eurobasket2015.org.gr 
 Christopher Razis at eurobasket.com
 Christopher Razis at bgbasket.com

1989 births
Living people
Cypriot men's basketball players
EWE Baskets Oldenburg players
Greek men's basketball players
Keravnos B.C. players
OFI Crete B.C. players
Point guards
Rethymno B.C. players
Rockets (basketball club) players
SC Rasta Vechta players
Shooting guards
Swiss men's basketball players
Sportspeople from Zürich